Goshen is a town in Pike County, Alabama, United States. At the 2010 census the population was 266, down from 300 in 2000. It incorporated in 1907.

History
A post office called Goshen has been in operation since 1839. The town was named after the biblical Land of Goshen.

Geography
Goshen is located at  (31.719715, -86.125861).

Demographics

As of the census of 2000, there were 300 people, 138 households, and 85 families residing in the town. The racial makeup of the town was 67.67% White, 29.33% Black or African American and 3.00% Native American.

There were 138 households, out of which 23.2% had children under the age of 18 living with them, 47.8% were married couples living together, 8.7% had a female householder with no husband present, and 38.4% were non-families. 37.0% of all households were made up of individuals, and 18.8% had someone living alone who was 65 years of age or older. The average household size was 2.17 and the average family size was 2.86.

In the town, the population was spread out, with 23.3% under the age of 18, 5.0% from 18 to 24, 23.3% from 25 to 44, 26.3% from 45 to 64, and 22.0% who were 65 years of age or older. The median age was 44 years. For every 100 females, there were 89.9 males. For every 100 females age 18 and over, there were 88.5 males.

The median income for a household in the town was $24,219, and the median income for a family was $28,393. Males had a median income of $22,969 versus $15,000 for females. The per capita income for the town was $13,664. About 17.2% of families and 23.7% of the population were below the poverty line, including 39.0% of those under the age of eighteen and 15.9% of those 65 or over.

Education
Goshen Public Schools are part of the Pike County School District (Alabama). Schools in the district include Goshen Elementary School, Pike County Elementary School, Banks Middle School, Goshen High School, Pike County High School and the Troy-Pike Center for Technology.

Goshen Elementary School (Alabama) and Goshen High School (Alabama) are located in Goshen.

Dr. Mark Bazzell is the Superintendent of Schools.

Notable person
 Mike Pelton, former NFL defensive tackle and current defensive line coach for the Georgia Tech Yellow Jackets
 Derrick Foster, former Iowa Hawkeye running backs coach and current running backs coach for the Los Angeles Chargers.

Gallery

See also

 List of towns in Alabama

References

External links

Towns in Pike County, Alabama
Towns in Alabama